Zaporizhzhia State Medical University (ZSMU) is a medical university in the small city of Zaporizhzhia, Ukraine. Zaporizhzhia State Medical University is a modern, multi-profile higher education institution of the 4th level of accreditation with the right of autonomous management.

History
In 1973, the preparatory faculty for foreign citizens was opened. More than 3,500 students have been trained for their further studies on the medical-biological specialties in the other higher educational establishments of Ukraine since then.

The University has its own a preventive-treatment dispensary and a sport-health resort on the seaside of the Azov sea.

Faculty and staff
At 52 chairs about 70 professors and doctors of science, about 300 assistant-professors and candidates of science, the academicians of native Academies, Honorary workers of science and engineering, Honorary workers of higher institutions of Ukraine, State prize winners are engaged in pedagogical and scientific-research work. The total number of teachers with scientific degrees is above 81,3%. At many chairs their total number is 100%.

Training fields
The system of training at Zaporizhzhia State Medical University includes the premedical, medical and post-diploma period of training. The premedical education is provided at the preparatory department for foreign citizens. The training of foreign students and their specializations is carried out at two departments: medical and pharmaceutical. At the Medical faculty the training is provided in the following specialties: 
Medicine. Qualification: MD Physician. Training term - 10 years.
Pediatrics. Qualification: Physician. Training term - 6 years.
Laboratory diagnostics. Qualification: Laboratory assistant bachelor. Training term 4 years.
Nursing. Qualification: Medical nurse bachelor. Training term 4 years. At the Pharmaceutical faculty students are trained for the specialties:
Pharmacy. Qualification: Pharmacist. Training term 1 year.
Technology of perfume-cosmetic preparations. Qualification: Pharmacist cosmetologist. Training term 5 years.
The training is carried on the specialties: General medicine, Pediatrics, Pharmacy.

Student life
The University has a  sport complex which includes a stadium with track and field athletic sectors, football field, sports grounds for handball, mini-football, volleyball, basketball. It has three gyms, a swimming pool, tennis courts, a shooting-range, a chess and draught club, a fitness club. Student's football matches take place regularly at the university. 

Different circles of amateur activities for those who like to play musical instruments, sing and dance exist. There is a team of "Jolly and Quick-witted Club" which take part in the Ukrainian games of "JQC". Every year the festivals "Student's Autumn", "Hello, We Are Looking For Talents", many concerts and festivals are held at the university.

Departments 
 Medicine Department;
Zaporizhzhia Medical Academy of Post-Graduate Education Ministry of Health of Ukraine;
 Pharmaceutical Department.

References

External links 
Official website

Universities in Ukraine
Medical schools in Ukraine
Universities and colleges in Zaporizhzhia